Context may refer to:

 Context (language use), the relevant constraints of the communicative situation that influence language use, language variation, and discourse summary

Computing
 Context (computing), the virtual environment required to suspend a running software program
 Lexical context or runtime context of a program, which determines name resolution; see Scope (computer science)
 Context awareness, a complementary to location awareness
 Context menu, a menu in a graphical user interface that appears upon user interaction
 ConTeXt, a macro package for the TeX typesetting system
 ConTEXT, a text editor for Microsoft Windows
 Operational context, a temporarily defined environment of cooperation
 Context (term rewriting), a formal expression  with a hole

Other uses
 Context (festival), an annual Russian festival of modern choreography
 Archaeological context, an event in time which has been preserved in the archaeological record
 Opaque context, the linguistic context in which substitution of co-referential expressions does not preserve truth
 Trama (mycology) (context or flesh), the mass of non-hymenial tissues that composes the mass of a fungal fruiting body
 Context (rapper), also known as Context MC, stage name of George Musgrave

See also
 
 
 Contextual (disambiguation)
 Contextualization (disambiguation)
 Locality (disambiguation)
 State (disambiguation)